The Ministry of Interior or Ministry of the Interior or Interior Ministry ( lit. Ministry of Internal Affairs) is a government ministry of the Republic of Turkey, responsible for interior security affairs in Turkey.

The current Minister of the Interior is Süleyman Soylu, after the resignation of his predecessor Efkan Ala in August 2016.

Functions 
The ministry is responsible for disaster and emergency management, immigration, inspection of local government, gendarmerie and coast guard (in peacetime), and police. The ministry helps to combat human trafficking, smuggling and bootleg alcohol.

Ministers of the Internal Affairs

See also 
 Ministry of the Interior (Ottoman Empire)

References

External links 
  
https://twitter.com/TC_icisleri

 
Turkey
1920 establishments in the Ottoman Empire
Turkey, Interior